Trigger Warning is the fourth EP by the Australian electronic music duo Knife Party, released on 20 November 2015 by Earstorm Records and Big Beat. It is Knife Party's first EP since the release of their Haunted House EP in 2013.

Track listing

References 

2015 EPs
Knife Party albums